The Sieg is a river in North Rhine-Westphalia and Rhineland-Palatinate, Germany. It is a right tributary of the Rhine.

The river is named after the Sicambri.

The source is located in the Rothaargebirge mountains. From here the river runs southwestwards to the city of Siegen and the hills of Siegerland, both named after the river. Further west the Sieg valley forms the boundary of the Bergisches Land (northern) and Westerwald (southern). The river finally runs through a protected area east of the city of Bonn.

After passing the cities of Hennef and Siegburg, the river flows into the Rhine at the Naturschutzgebiet Siegaue, a protected area immediately to the northeast of the city of Bonn, near Niederkassel/.

Sieg Spring

The location was restored in 2013.

Tributaries

The main tributaries of the Sieg are, from source to mouth:
Ferndorfbach (right)
Weiß (left)
Asdorf (right)
Heller (left)
Wisser Bach (right)
Nister (left)
Bröl (right)
Wahnbach (right)
Pleisbach (left)
Agger (right)

See also 
List of rivers of North Rhine-Westphalia
List of rivers of Rhineland-Palatinate

References 

 
Rivers of North Rhine-Westphalia
Rivers of Rhineland-Palatinate
Rivers of Siegerland
Rivers of the Westerwald
Rivers of Germany